The 1995 Wyoming Cowboys football team represented the University of Wyoming in the 1995 NCAA Division I-A football season. The Cowboys were led by fifth-year head coach Joe Tiller and played their home games at War Memorial Stadium in Laramie, Wyoming. They finished the season with a 6–5 record overall and a 4–4 record in the Western Athletic Conference to finish 6th in the conference.

Schedule

References

Wyoming
Wyoming Cowboys football seasons
Wyoming Cowboys football